The Manihar are a Muslim community, found mainly in North India.

History and origin
The word  is derived from man, meaning 'jewel' in Urdu, and the agentive suffix .manihar word meaning in Sanskrit mani dharnashya ( मणि को धारण करने वाला अर्थात शिव )   they are also known as Manihar siddique (not to be confused with sheikh siddiqui) and saudagars. 

Manihar communities are found mainly in Gujarat, Madhya Pradesh, Rajasthan, and Uttar Pradesh.
Their main clans are the Bachchal, Bhadauriya, Chandchi, Kachchoiyana, Khalri, Talwar, Turk, Uzbek, Parmaar, Banjara, Rananjay and Raikwar. Some of these clans are territorial groupings, while some reflect origins from other communities, such as the Kachwaha and Parmar. The surname Siddique is frequent in the Manihar community though they do not consider themselves to be sheikh siddiqui. A section of the Manihar may be Muslim Rajput.

Current circumstances: India

The Manihar are Sunni Hanafi Muslims and like other artisan communities in North India, are fairly orthodox.

Uttar Pradesh
The Manihar of Uttar Pradesh have a traditional community council, which resolves disputes within the community. They are an endogamous community with a preference for and parallel cousin and cross-cousin marriages.

Rajasthan
In Rajasthan, the Manihar are found in Jhunjhunu, Jaipur, Sikar, Churu and Ajmer districts. They are bangle makers and dealers in lac or sealing wax. The Manihar community in Rajasthan speak the Shekhawati dialect of Rajasthani. They are endogamous community maintaining a system of gotra exogamy. They are divided into three territorial groupings, the Shishgar, Shekhawati and Padiya, which are further divided into several clans. The Shaikh clan is one pre-eminent clan in the community. Shekhawati Manihar have five main clans: the Sheikh, Sayyed, Mughal, Gori and Chauhan. 

These are further classified into many subclans, such as:

Elsewhere in India
In Madhya Pradesh Manihar are also known as Soudagar or Saudagar.

In Gujarat, the Manihar are also referred to as the Shaikh sahab. They are mainly concentrated in Ahmedabad, but also found in the districts of Kutch, Kheda, Jamnagar and Vadodara. The community claim to have come from Sindh and speak Kutchi, and have three clans, the Lodani, Kachani and Ishani. They have their own  (a 'forum' or 'society'), as a "caste" association: the Gujarat Manihar Jamaat.

See also
 , in Persian wiktionary fa:انجمن
 Muslim Raibhat
 Sayyid
 Shaikhs

References

Further reading
 

Social groups of Pakistan
Shaikh clans
Muslim communities of Rajasthan
Muhajir communities
Muslim communities of Gujarat
Muslim communities of Uttar Pradesh